Mikael Berger is a Swedish sprint canoer who competed in the mid-1980s. He won a gold medal in the K-2 10000 m event at the 1985 ICF Canoe Sprint World Championships in Mechelen.

References

Living people
Swedish male canoeists
Year of birth missing (living people)
ICF Canoe Sprint World Championships medalists in kayak